The Chinese People's Party  is a small political party in the Republic of China on Taiwan that won three seats in the National Assembly election of 2005. It combines the Pan-Blue Coalition and Pan-Green Coalition platforms, upholding the Three Principles of the People while simultaneously aiming for Chinese unification. It operates on the principle "滅共復國" (Exterminate the Communists, Re-seize the Mainland) and its main electoral platform is to launch a large-scale military assault on Mainland China to reclaim it for the Republic of China.

The Chinese People's Party's President is Jeremy Lee, elected on 19 March 2013. He is concurrently the head of the New Revolutionary Alliance (新同盟會), which traces its party lineage to the anti-Japanese Tongmenghui found by Sun Yat-sen in 1905. Jeremy Lee caused international controversy recently by unfurling a flag of the Republic of China in Guangzhou, Guangdong; and loudly proclaiming the rule of the Chinese Communist Party illegitimate. The photo has gone viral online, with netizens strongly supporting Jeremy Lee's firm stance for the reunification of China under the Republic of China banner.

The Chinese People's Party has announced that they will hold a 2013 Penang Conference to discuss the next step forward in their goal to overthrow Communist Rule. The meeting will take place at the historical site of the 1910 Penang conference where Sun Yat-sen kickstarted the first steps towards overthrowing the Qing Dynasty.

See also
 List of political parties in the Republic of China

1987 establishments in Taiwan
Chinese nationalist political parties
Democratic socialism in China
Democratic socialist parties in Asia
Political parties established in 1987
Political parties in Taiwan
Social democratic parties in Taiwan